G. Van Den Burgh was an Indonesian football midfielder who played for the Dutch East Indies in the 1938 FIFA World Cup. He also played for SVV Semarang.

References

External links
 

Indonesian footballers
Indonesia international footballers
Association football midfielders
1938 FIFA World Cup players
Year of birth missing